Mount Bannon ( is located in the Teton Range, on the border of Caribou-Targhee National Forest and Grand Teton National Park in the U.S. state of Wyoming. The peak is named for Thomas M Bannon  and rises to the west above Death Canyon.

References

Mountains of Grand Teton National Park
Mountains of Wyoming
Mountains of Teton County, Wyoming